José Acosta (March 4, 1891 – November 16, 1977) was a Cuban-born starting pitcher in Major League Baseball who played three seasons for the Chicago White Sox and Washington Senators. Before joining the white minor leagues he played the 1915 season in "Negro baseball" as a member of the integrated Long Branch Cubans (Riley, 26).

Acosta played winter baseball in the Cuban League from 1912 to 1930. He led the league in winning percentage five times: in 1914/15, 1915/16, /1917, 1918/19, and 1924/25. He also led the league in wins in 1918/19 and 1920/21. His best season was in 1918/19 when he had a 16–10 record. He was elected to the Cuban Baseball Hall of Fame in 1958.

Notes

References
.
Riley, James A. (2002). The Biographical Encyclopedia of the Negro Baseball Leagues. 2nd edition. New York: Carroll & Graf Publ. .

External links

1891 births
1977 deaths
Baseball players from Havana
Major League Baseball players from Cuba
Cuban expatriate baseball players in the United States
Long Branch Cubans players
Chicago White Sox players
Habana players
Marianao players
Orientals players
Washington Senators (1901–1960) players
Major League Baseball pitchers
High Point Pointers players
Kansas City Blues (baseball) players
Mobile Bears players
Oakland Oaks (baseball) players
Rochester Hustlers players
Vancouver Beavers players
Cuban expatriate baseball players in Canada